The Department of Social and Preventive Medicine (popularly known as SPM) is one of 22 teaching departments in the Faculty of Medicine, University of Malaya. It was formed in 1964, one year after the founding of the Faculty of Medicine in the University of Malaya in Kuala Lumpur. The department is involved in both Undergraduate and Postgraduate teachings.

There are more than 1,000 graduates from Master of Public Health, Master of Medical Science in Public Health, Master of Medical Science (Research), Master of Public Health(Speciality), Doctor of Public Health and Doctor of Philosophy.  

They originate from Malaysia and around the world and serve in the Ministry of Health, universities, and various National and International bodies in Malaysia and around the world; e.g. the Malaysian Armed Forces, World Health Organization (WHO) and Médecins Sans Frontières (MSF), and in town and city councils.

See also
 Faculty of Medicine, University of Malaya
 University of Malaya
 Wikiversity:Topic:Community Medicine

References

External links 
 

Malaya
University of Malaya
Universities and colleges in Kuala Lumpur
Educational institutions established in 1964
1964 establishments in Malaysia